The 1953 Southeastern Louisiana Lions football team was an American football team that represented Southeastern Louisiana College (now known as Southeastern Louisiana University) as a member of the Gulf States Conference (GSC) during the 1953 college football season. In their third year under head coach Stan Galloway, the team compiled an overall record of 6–3 with a mark of 5–1 in conference play, tying for first place in the GSC.

Schedule

References

Southeastern Louisiana
Southeastern Louisiana Lions football seasons
Southeastern Louisiana Lions football